Dive In is the debut album by Darius Danesh, released on 2 December 2002. It was a huge success and went platinum in the UK, charting at number 6 on the UK Albums Chart during the competitive pre-Christmas sales. He wrote all 12 songs on the album, collaborating with a number of other producers such as The Misfits (Pete Glenister, Deni Lew) and The Matrix. Steve Lillywhite was executive producer and Darius himself produced the track "Better Than That".

Album information
The first single "Colourblind", was released on 29 July 2002 and went straight to number 1 in the UK for two weeks and was certified silver. The second single "Rushes", also did well, going to number 5 in the UK charts, and the third single "Incredible (What I Meant to Say)" went to number 9. The fourth and last single "Girl in the Moon" did not do as well but still got to number 21. The album actually has 69 tracks, but after the first 12 they are all 5 seconds of silence until the last one, which is a songwriting demo of "Gotta Know Tonight", effectively making it a hidden track. This songwriting demo has lyrics and music written by Danesh, showing the song as it was first written before other producers added their production ideas to the song. The album was certified platinum in the UK for selling over 300,000 copies.

Track listing

Personnel
 Artwork – Tom Bird
 Executive Producer – Steve Lillywhite
 Photography – Norman Watson
 Producer – The Misfits (Pete Glenister, Deni Lew), (tracks: 1, 2, 4, 5, 8, 9, 11, 12)

Charts

Weekly charts

Year-end charts

Certifications

References

Darius Campbell albums
2002 debut albums
19 Recordings albums
Mercury Records albums